The Journal of Mixed Methods Research is a peer-reviewed academic journal that publishes papers in the field of Research Methods. The journal's editors are Michael D. Fetters (Department of Family Medicine, Michigan Medicine, University of Michigan, United States) and Jose F. Molina-Azorin (University of Alicante, Alicante, Spain). It has been in publication since 2007 and is currently published by SAGE Publications.

Scope 
The Journal of Mixed Methods Research publishes empirical, methodological and theoretical articles about mixed methods research across social and behavioral sciences. The interdisciplinary journal aims to highlight where mixed methods research may be used more effectively and design and procedure issues.

Abstracting and indexing 
The Journal of Mixed Methods Research is abstracted and indexed in, among other databases:  SCOPUS, and the Social Sciences Citation Index. According to the Journal Citation Reports, its 2018 impact factor is 3.524, ranking it 1 out of 98 journals in the category ‘Social Sciences, Interdisciplinary’.

References

External links 
 

SAGE Publishing academic journals
English-language journals
Multidisciplinary social science journals
Quarterly journals
Publications established in 2007